The Arab Socialist Movement (- ) also known as Arab Socialist Party, was a political party in Syria that has split into several factions since the 1960s which continue to use the same name.

History 
The Arab Socialist Movement traced its roots back to the "Youth Party", a 1930s radical anti-capitalist, pan-Arab group led by Othman al-Hawrani. In its later form, it was formally established as "Arab Socialist Party" in the 1950s, and was led by Akram al-Hawrani from then on. The party merged with the Ba'ath Party in 1953, only to withdraw again in 1963. It then split into several factions: 
 One faction, known as Damascus branch and headed by Abdul-Ghani Qannout, joined the Ba'ath Party-led National Progressive Front government in 1972 and has continued to support the al-Assad family's rule in Syria ever since. It is active in Syria and Lebanon. After Abdul-Ghani Qannout died in 2001, Ahmad al-Ahmad became the new secretary general; under him, the party continued its pro-government course, even during the Syrian Civil War. Amid the conflict's civil uprising phase, the Arab Socialist Movement's Damascus branch organised pro-government rallies. When the uprising escalated into a full insurgency, members of the party organised pro-government militias. Assistant secretary general Omar Adnan al-Alawi headed the National Defence Forces' Deir ez-Zor branch during part of the Siege of Deir ez-Zor (2014–17), and was wounded in combat. Al-Alawi later aided a member of the party's political office, Turki Albu Hamad, in founding the "Forces of the Fighters of the Tribes" militia. Ahmad al-Ahmad died on 25 August 2016, leaving the office of secretary general vacant until the election of Omar al-Alawi as official party head on 24 May 2017.
 Another splinter group was led by the former officer Abdul-Ghani Ayyash (died 2010), and joined the opposition in form of the National Democratic Rally.
 One faction of Marxists, led by Akram al-Bunni, split off and formed the "National Council of Damascus Declaration for National Democratic Change", which was suppressed by the Assad government.
Another branch has also gained legal recognition and parliamentary representation in Syria, but under the name "National Vow Movement".

References

Bibliography

1950 establishments in Syria
Arab nationalism in Syria
Arab socialist political parties
Ba'ath Party breakaway groups
Political parties established in 1950
Political parties in Syria
Secularism in Syria
Socialist parties in Syria

de:Arabische Sozialistische Bewegung